Ilya Ilyich Mechnikov (– 15 July 1916), also spelled Élie Metchnikoff, was a Russian zoologist best known for his pioneering research in immunology. He and Paul Ehrlich were jointly awarded the 1908 Nobel Prize in Physiology or Medicine "in recognition of their work on immunity". 

Mechnikov was born in modern-day Ukraine to a Moldavian noble father and a Ukrainian-Jewish mother, lived and worked for many years on the territory of what was then the Russian Empire, and later on continued his career in France. Given this complex heritage, four different nations and peoples justifiably lay claim to Metchnikoff. Despite having a mother of Jewish origin, he was baptized Russian Orthodox, although he later became an atheist.

Honoured as the "father of innate immunity", Metchnikoff was the first to discover a process of immunity called phagocytosis and the cell responsible for it, called phagocyte, specifically macrophage, in 1882. This discovery turned out to be the major defence mechanism in innate immunity, as well as the foundation of the concept of cell-mediated immunity, while Ehrlich established the concept of humoral immunity to complete the principles of immune system. Their works are regarded as the foundation of the science of immunology.

Metchnikoff developed one of the earliest concepts in ageing, and advocated the use of lactic acid bacteria (Lactobacillus) for healthy and long life. This became the concept of probiotics in medicine. Mechnikov is also credited with coining the term gerontology in 1903, for the emerging study of aging and longevity. In this regard, Ilya Mechnikov is called the "father of gerontology" (although, as often happens in science, the situation is ambiguous, and the same title is sometimes applied to some other people who contributed to aging research later).

Supporters of life extension celebrate 15 May as Metchnikoff Day, and used it as a memorable date for organizing activities.

Early life, family and education

He was the youngest of five children of Ilya Ivanovich Mechnikov, an officer of the Imperial Guard. His mother, Emilia Lvovna (Nevakhovich), the daughter of the writer Leo Nevakhovich, largely influenced him on his education, especially in science. The Nevakhovich family was Jewish.The family name Mechnikov is a translation from Romanian, since his father was a descendant of the Chancellor Yuri Stefanovich, the grandson of Nicolae Milescu Spătaru. The word "mech" is a Russian translation of the Romanian "spadă" (sword), which originated with Spătar (Sword-bearer). His elder brother Lev became a prominent geographer and sociologist.

In 1856, Metchnikoff entered the Kharkov Lycée, where he developed his interest in biology. Convinced by his mother to study natural sciences instead of medicine, in 1862 he tried to study biology at the University of Würzburg, but the German academic session would not start by the end of the year. Metchnikoff thus enrolled at Kharkov Imperial University for natural sciences, completing his four-year degree in two years.

In 1864, he traveled to Germany to study marine fauna on the small North Sea island of Heligoland. He was advised by the botanist Ferdinand Cohn to work with Rudolf Leuckart at the University of Giessen. It was in Leuckart's laboratory that he made his first scientific discovery of alternation of generations (sexual and asexual) in nematodes (Chaetosomatida) and then at the University of Munich. In 1865, while at Giessen, he discovered intracellular digestion in flatworm, and this study influenced his later works. Moving to Naples the next year he worked on a doctoral thesis on the embryonic development of the cuttle-fish Sepiola and the crustacean Nebalia. A cholera epidemic in the autumn of 1865 made him move to the University of Göttingen, where he worked briefly with W. M. Keferstein and Jakob Henle.

In 1867, he returned to Russia to receive his doctorate with Alexander Kovalevsky from the University of Saint Petersburg. Together they won the Karl Ernst von Baer prize for their theses on the development of germ layers in invertebrate embryos.

Career and achievements
Metchnikoff was appointed docent at the newly established Imperial Novorossiya University (now Odessa University). Only twenty-two years of age, he was younger than his students. After being involved in a conflict with a senior colleague over attending scientific meetings, he transferred to the University of Saint Petersburg in 1868, where he experienced a worse professional environment. In 1870 he returned to Odessa to take up the appointment of Titular Professor of Zoology and Comparative Anatomy.

In 1882 he resigned from Odessa University due to political turmoils after the assassination of Alexander II. He went to Sicily to set up his private laboratory in Messina. He returned to Odessa as director of an institute set up to carry out Louis Pasteur's vaccine against rabies; due to some difficulties, he left in 1888 and went to Paris to seek Pasteur's advice. Pasteur gave him an appointment at the Pasteur Institute, where he remained for the rest of his life.

Metchnikoff became interested in the study of microbes, and especially the immune system. At Messina he discovered phagocytosis after experimenting on the larvae of starfish. In 1882 he first demonstrated the process when he inserted small citrus thorns into starfish larvae, then found unusual cells surrounding the thorns. He realized that in animals which have blood, the white blood cells gather at the site of inflammation, and he hypothesised that this could be the process by which bacteria were attacked and killed by the white blood cells. He discussed his hypothesis with Carl Friedrich Wilhelm Claus, Professor of Zoology at the University of Vienna, who suggested to him the term "phagocyte" for a cell which can surround and kill pathogens. He delivered his findings at Odessa University in 1883.

His theory, that certain white blood cells could engulf and destroy harmful bodies such as bacteria, met with scepticism from leading specialists including Louis Pasteur, Emil von Behring, and others. At the time, most bacteriologists believed that white blood cells ingested pathogens and then spread them further through the body. His major supporter was Rudolf Virchow, who published his research in his Archiv für pathologische Anatomie und Physiologie und für klinische Medicin (now called the Virchows Archiv). His discovery of these phagocytes ultimately won him the Nobel Prize in 1908. He worked with Émile Roux on calomel (mercurous chloride) in ointment form in an attempt to prevent people from contracting the sexually transmitted disease syphilis.

In 1887, he observed that leukocytes isolated from the blood of various animals were attracted towards certain bacteria. The first studies of leukocyte killing in the presence of specific antiserum were performed by Joseph Denys and Joseph Leclef, followed by Leon Marchand and Mennes between 1895 and 1898. Almoth E. Wright was the first to quantify this phenomenon and strongly advocated its potential therapeutic importance. The so-called resolution of the humoralist and cellularist positions by showing their respective roles in the setting of enhanced killing in the presence of opsonins was popularized by Wright after 1903, although Metchnikoff acknowledged the stimulatory capacity of immunosentisitized serum on phagotic function in the case of acquired immunity.

This attraction was soon proposed to be due to soluble elements released by the bacteria (see Harris for a review of this area up to 1953). Some 85 years after this seminal observation, laboratory studies showed that these elements were low molecular weight (between 150 and 1500 Dalton (unit)s) N-formylated oligopeptides, including the most prominent member of this group, N-Formylmethionine-leucyl-phenylalanine, that are made by a variety of replicating gram positive bacteria and gram negative bacteria. Metchnikoff's early observation, then, was the foundation for studies that defined a critical mechanism by which bacteria attract leukocytes to initiate and direct the innate immune response of acute inflammation to sites of host invasion by pathogens.

Metchnikoff also self-experimented with cholera that initially supported the probiotic notion. During the 1892 cholera epidemic in France, he was surprised by the fact that the disease affected only some people but not others when they were equally exposed to the infection. To understand the differences in susceptibility to the disease, he drank a sample of cholera but never got sick. He tested on two volunteers of which one was not affected while the other almost died. He hypothesised that the difference in cholera infection was due to differences in intestinal microbes, speculating that those who have plenty of beneficial ones would be healthier.

The issues of aging occupied a significant place in Metchnikoff's works. Metchnikoff developed a theory that aging is caused by toxic bacteria in the gut and that lactic acid could prolong life. He attributed the longevity of Bulgarian peasants to their yogurt consumption that contained what was called the Bulgarian bacteria (now called Lactobacillus delbrueckii subsp. bulgaricus). To validate his theory, he drank sour milk every day throughout his life. His scientific reasonings on the subject were written in his books The Nature of Man: Studies in Optimistic Philosophy (1903) and more expressively in The Prolongation of Life: Optimistic Studies (1907). He also espoused the potential life-lengthening properties of lactic acid bacteria such as Lactobacillus delbrueckii subsp. bulgaricus. This concept of probiotics, which he termed "orthobiosis," was influential in his lifetime, but became ignored until the mid-1990s when experimental evidence emerged.

Awards and recognitions
Metchnikoff won the Karl Ernst von Baer prize in 1867 with Alexander Kovalevsky based on their doctoral research. He shared the Nobel Prize in Physiology or Medicine in 1908 with Paul Ehrlich . He was awarded honorary degree from the University of Cambridge in Cambridge, UK, and the Copley Medal of the Royal Society in 1906. He was given honorary memberships in the Academy of Medicine in Paris and the Academy of Sciences and Medicine in Saint Petersburg. The Leningrad Medical Institute of Hygiene and Sanitation, founded in 1911 was merged with Saint Petersburg State Medical Academy of Postgraduate Studies in 2011 to become the North-Western State Medical University, named after Metchnikoff. The Odessa I. I. Mechnikov National University is in Odessa, Ukraine.

Personal life and views

Metchnikoff married his first wife, Ludmila Feodorovitch, in 1869. She died from tuberculosis on 20 April 1873. Her death, combined with other problems, caused Metchnikoff to attempt suicide, taking a large dose of opium. In 1875, he married his student Olga Belokopytova. In 1885 Olga suffered from severe typhoid and this led to his second suicide attempt. He injected himself with the spirochete of relapsing fever. (Olga died in 1944 in Paris from typhoid.)

Despite being baptized in the Russian Orthodox Church, Metchnikoff was an atheist.

He was greatly influenced by Charles Darwin's theory of evolution. He first read Fritz Müller's Für Darwin (For Darwin) in Giessen. From this he became a supporter of natural selection and Ernst Haeckel's biogenetic law. His scientific works and theories were inspired by Darwinism.

Metchnikoff died in 1916 in Paris from heart failure. According to his will, his body was used for medical research and afterwards cremated in Père Lachaise Cemetery crematorium. His cinerary urn has been placed in the Pasteur Institute library.

Publications 
Metchnikoff wrote notable books and papers, including:
 Leçons sur la pathologie comparée de l’inflammation (1892; Lectures on the Comparative Pathology of Inflammation)
 L’Immunité dans les maladies infectieuses (1901; Immunity in Infectious Diseases)
 Études sur la nature humaine (1903; The Nature of Man)
 Immunity in Infective Diseases (1905)
 The New Hygiene: Three Lectures on the Prevention of Infectious Diseases (1906)
 The Prolongation of Life: Optimistic Studies (1907)

Explanatory notes

References

Further reading

External links

 The Romantic Rationalist: A Study Of Elie Metchnikoff
 Works of Elie Metchnikoff, a Pasteur Institute bibliography
 Books written by I.I.Mechnikov (In Russian)
 Lactobacillus bulgaricus on the web
 Tsalyk St. Immunity defender 
 Immunity in Infective Diseases (1905) by Élie Metchnikoff, translated by Francis B. Binny, on the Internet Archive
 The Prolongation of Life: Optimistic Studies (1908) by Élie Metchnikoff, translation edited by P. Chalmers Mitchell, on the Internet Archive
 Luba Vikhanski's page for Metchnikoff's documentary
 Mechnikov Ilya, 1845 - 1916, Year won 1908, A pioneer researcher of immunity on the ANU - Museum of the Jewish People
 

1845 births
1916 deaths
Academy of Fine Arts, Munich alumni
Foreign Members of the Royal Society
Emigrants from the Russian Empire to France
Russian gerontologists
Honorary members of the Saint Petersburg Academy of Sciences
National University of Kharkiv alumni
Nobel laureates in Physiology or Medicine
Pasteur Institute
People from Kharkiv Oblast
Recipients of the Copley Medal
Russian atheists
Russian immunologists
Russian people of Ukrainian-Jewish descent
Russian Nobel laureates
Russian people of Romanian descent
Russian zoologists
University of Göttingen alumni